Kurumbukara Pasanga is a 2013 Indian Tamil-language romantic drama film directed by T,R. Samidurai starring Sanjeev and Monika.

Cast 
Sanjeev as Sasi
Monika as Sindhu
Pandiarajan
Manobala as a cop
K. Ravirajan
Thennale as a cop
Chelladurai
Nellai Siva

Soundtrack 
The music is composed by Arul Raj. Lyrics by Snehan and Kavinpa.

"Enthan Thalaiyil" - Harish Raghavendra, Madhumitha  
"Deepavali" - Anand
"Pathika Vacha" -  Krishna Iyer 
"Kuruchi Kallakuruchi’" - Vijayan
"Nanthan Nee Kaetta Mapillai"  - Krishna Iyer, Anuradha Sriram

Reception 
A critic from The Times of India gave the film a rating of one out of five stars and opined that "There is little that happens in ‘Kurumbukara Pasanga’ thanks to the poor screenplay, written by director Samydurai himself". Malini Mannath of The New Indian Express wrote that "An insipid narration and a lacklustre script makes sure that we lose interest soon enough".

References 

Indian romantic drama films
2010s Tamil-language films